Streptomyces fuscigenes is a bacterium species from the genus of Streptomyces which has been isolated from a bamboo Sasa borealis from Damyang in Korea.

See also 
 List of Streptomyces species

References 

fuscigenes
Bacteria described in 2018